Ghezzi & Brian is an Italian motorcycle engineering firm and manufacturer based in Missaglia.

History
Ghezzi & Brian was founded in 1995 by Giuseppe Ghezzi and Bruno (Brian) Saturno to develop racing motorcycles using twin-cylinder engines.

Starting in 1999, the company began to also sell motorcycles for street use.  A fundamental characteristic of all the Ghezzi & Brian machines is sportiness and personality derived from Moto Guzzi V layout twin-cylinder engines.

Models
The first model put in production is the SuperTwin 1100, derived from the Championship 1996 machine.

The Furia is a "sport naked".

The Pro-Thunder has been developed exclusively for the participation in the American A.M.A. Championship. It has a Moto Guzzi 1225 cc motor.

The latest model, introduced in 2004, is the Fionda.

Engineering and tuning
Ghezzi & Brian are active, beyond as motorcycle manufacturer, also as:
Engineering for the motorcycle industry. Activity begun in 2002 and that has given rise to the Moto Guzzi MGS-01 Corsa.
Tuning, dedicated particularly to Moto Guzzi but not exclusively to them. It also produces parts and chassis the customer's specifications.

See also 

List of Italian companies
List of motorcycle manufacturers

External links
Official web site

Motorcycle manufacturers of Italy
Italian brands
Manufacturing companies established in 1995
Italian  companies established in 1995